Hills of Hate is a 1926 Australian silent film directed by Raymond Longford, based on the debut novel by E. V. Timms, who also did the screenplay. It is considered a lost film.

Synopsis
A feud exists between two outback families, the Blakes and the Ridgeways, caused by Sam Ridgeway having married a woman Jim Blake was in love with. The feud goes on for over thirty years.

Blake's eldest son, also called Jim (Gordon Collingridge) returns from being away for ten years and falls in love with Ridgeway's daughter Ellen (Dorothy Gordon). Matters are complicated by Sam Ridgeway's villainous overseer, Cummins (Big Bill Wilson).

Cast
Dorothy Gordon as Ellen Ridgeway
Gordon Collingridge as Jim Blake
Big Bill Wilson as Black Joe Cummins
Clifford Toone as Jim Blake Snr
Kathleen Wilson as Peggy Blake
Stanley Lonsdale as Stanley Ridgeway

Original Novel
E. V. Timms' original novel was published in 1925. The Bulletin called it "A virile   Australian   story,   though  rough-cut   and   without   pretence   to   literary   quality."

Production
Master Pictures bought the screen rights in January 1926 and Timms was hired to write the script. "  The studio would make it after two other outdoors adventures, The Pioneers and Tall Timber. Raymond Longford, who directed both Pioneers and Hills of Hate later said at the 1927 Royal Commission that both films "were selected by the directors of the combine; they were produced at an inadequate expense  an in many cases the cast was chosen despite my protests. During the  filming of these pictures I recognised that these pictures were absurdly cheap and inadequate to  secure even an English market."

The films stars were Dorothy   Gordon  and Gordon Collingrdige, who Everyones said was "well   known   to   fans" having "established   him self   by   his   remarkable work   opposite   Lotus   Thompson   and   now,  as   a   leading   man   he  is   greatly   in  demand." Kevin Gallagher was a recent arrival from Ireland. Gordon had worked in Hollywood for six years and did art direction on For the Term of His Natural Life (1927). She and later became a radio commentator and newspaper columnist under the name of Andrea.

'Big' Bill Wilson was a professional boxer before being discovered by a casting agent at the Sydney Stadium and cast in Tall Timber (1927).

Shooting
In late March 1926 the unit left for  Gloucester, New South Wales for a six week shoot near Avon.

Filming was delayed by weather.  Willian Thornton, juvenile lead, was injured on location but recovered by May. Studio work in Bondi started in late April and was finished by May.

Raymond Longford's son Victor served as associate producer.

Reception
The Northern Times said Collingridge played his role "with a skill remarkable in such a young actor, whilst Dorothy Gordon's portrayal is a powerfully competing proof of her ability." Everyones said it was "chiefly   remarkable   for   some   excellent   photography...  There   is   plenty   of   fast   action   and  some   hard   riding   in   this   typical outback   Australian   story."

The film was not a success at the box office – although it was screening in cinemas as late as 1933 –  and it was several years before Longford managed to direct another feature, The Man They Could Not Hang (1934). This turned out to be his last movie as director.

In July 1926 Australasian Pictures decided to move into bigger budgeted territory making a version of For the Term of His Natural Life.

References

External links

Hills of Hate at National Film and Sound Archive
The Hills of Hate novel at AustLit
The Hills of Hate film at AustLit
Complete abridged version of original story at Australian Women's Weekly in 1936
Serialised version of story from 1927 – 29 Oct, 5 Nov, 19 Nov, 26Nov, 3 Dec, 10 Dec, 17 Dec, 24 Dec, 31 Dec

1926 films
Australian drama films
Australian silent feature films
Australian black-and-white films
Films directed by Raymond Longford
Lost Australian films
Films from Australasian Films
1926 drama films
1926 lost films
Lost drama films
Silent drama films